Magen Dan (lit. Dan Shield) is an Israeli outpost in the West Bank. It is located around 750 metres west of Elkana and – consistent with its name – at the eastern edge of the territory of the biblical tribe of Dan. Established in May 1999, it falls under the jurisdiction of Shomron Regional Council. 

Israeli outposts in the West Bank, like Magen Dan, are considered illegal both under international law as well as under Israeli law.

According to ARIJ, Magen Dan was established after Israeli settlers "forcefully seized"  of land from the nearby Palestinian village of Zawiya.

References

Unauthorized Israeli settlements
Populated places established in 1999
1999 establishments in the Palestinian territories
Israeli outposts